Michael Pierce (3 September 1869 – 4 February 1913) was an Australian cricketer. He played eight first-class matches for New South Wales and Queensland between 1892/93 and 1894/95.

Short, thick-set and muscular, Mick Pierce was a slow leg-break bowler who could spin the ball sharply even on the hardest pitch. On his first-class debut in December 1892, which was also the first-ever Sheffield Shield match, Pierce opened the bowling for New South Wales and took 8 for 111 and 5 for 154, but South Australia nevertheless won by 57 runs. A week later, in the second Sheffield Shield match, he took 6 for 100 and 1 for 63 against Victoria, but again he was on the losing side. Despite this brilliant beginning to his career he quickly faded from the first-class scene, apparently through lack of ambition.

He died after a long illness.

See also
 List of New South Wales representative cricketers

References

External links
 

1869 births
1913 deaths
Australian cricketers
New South Wales cricketers
Queensland cricketers
Cricketers from Sydney